The Faculty of Arts was one of the four traditional divisions of the teaching bodies of medieval universities.

Particular faculties of arts include:

 Faculty of Arts, Charles Sturt University, New South Wales, Victoria and Australian Capital Territory, Australia
 Faculty of Arts, University of Melbourne, Victoria, Australia
 Faculty of Arts, Monash University, Melbourne, Australia
 Faculty of Arts, University of Alberta, Edmonton, Alberta, Canada
 Faculty of Arts, University of Waterloo, Ontario, Canada
 Faculty of Arts, McGill University, Montreal, Quebec, Canada
 Faculty of Arts, Aarhus University, Denmark
 Faculty of Arts, Banaras Hindu University, Varanasi, Uttar Pradesh, India
 Universiteti i Prishtinës Faculty of Arts, Pristina, Kosovo
 Faculty of Arts, University of Priština, North Mitrovica, Kosovo
 Faculty of Arts, University of Colombo, Sri Lanka
 Faculty of Arts, University of Peradeniya, Sri Lanka
 Faculty of Arts, Chulalongkorn University, Bangkok, Thailand
 Faculty of Arts, University of Brighton, United Kingdom

See also
 Faculty of  Arts and Humanities, University College London, United Kingdom
 Faculty of Arts and Science, University of Toronto, Canada
 Faculty of Arts and Sciences, Harvard, Cambridge, Massachusetts, United States
 Faculty of Arts and Sciences, Queen's University, Kingston, Ontario, Canada
 Faculty of Arts and Social Sciences, University of New South Wales, Kensington, Sydney, Australia
 Faculty of Arts and Social Sciences, University of Sydney, Australia
 Faculty of Arts and Social Sciences, National University of Singapore
 Faculty of Arts and Sciences Building, Istanbul University, Turkey